Viacheslav Valentinovich Nikulin (Slava) is a Russian mathematician working in the algebraic geometry of K3 surfaces and Calabi–Yau threefolds, mirror symmetry, the arithmetic of quadratic forms, and hyperbolic Kac–Moody algebras. He is a professor of mathematics at the University of Liverpool. A third chair of mathematics was established for Nikulin in 1999, the second chair having been established in 1964 for C. T. C. Wall and the first having been established in 1882. Nikulin has made contributions towards the solution of Hilbert's 16th problem.

Publications

References

Academics of the University of Liverpool
Living people
Russian mathematicians
Year of birth missing (living people)